"Rump Shaker" is a song by American hip-hop group Wreckx-N-Effect. It was released in August 1992 as the lead single from their second album, Hard or Smooth. It features production and guest vocals from Teddy Riley, brother of Wreckx member Markell Riley.

Due to the massive success of Whitney Houston's version of "I Will Always Love You," the song did not advance further than No. 2 on the Billboard Hot 100 and Hot R&B/Hip-Hop Singles & Tracks charts. Nevertheless, it peaked at No. 1 on the Hot Rap Singles, and No. 9 on the Hot Dance Music/Club Play charts.

The chorus of the 2008 single, "Paper Planes" by British musician M.I.A. was widely speculated to be based on the chorus, although the song's writers are not credited.

Composition
"Rump Shaker" is built on a saxophone sample from the 1972 song "Darkest Light" by Lafayette Afro Rock Band and a drum sample from "Midnight Theme" by Manzel. Other samples include "Scratchin'" by the Magic Disco Machine and "Blues and Pants" by James Brown (the vocal "come on!"). Riley's "Rump Shaker (Teddy 2)" remix adds a bass and piano sample from "Blind Alley" by The Emotions as well as a vocal sample from "Stop, Look, Listen" by MC Lyte. Additionally, Teddy Riley's verse includes an allusion to the 1982 song "I Like It" by DeBarge, with the lines, "I like the way you comb your hair, I like the stylish clothes you wear, it's just the little things you do...".

The song opens with Teddy Riley chanting the chorus "All I wanna do is zooma-zoom-zoom-zoom and a boom-boom." Subsequent verses are rapped by Aqil Davidson, Teddy Riley, and Markell Riley. Teddy Riley's verse is notable for being written by his young protégé Pharrell Williams, later to achieve fame as a member of The Neptunes and a solo artist.  It was rumored that Pharrell, along with fellow future-Neptune Chad Hugo, contributed additional production work, but producer Ty Fyffe stated in a 2011 interview that he and Teddy Riley alone produced the song and that Pharrell's only contribution was lyrical.

Reception
The accompanying music video, depicting Wreckx-N-Effect and Riley hosting a party at Virginia Beach, received criticism for its alleged exploitation of women in bikinis. The video was banned from MTV.

Track listing

A-side
"Rump Shaker" (Radio Remix)- 4:34
"Rump Shaker" (Bonus Beat)- 5:55
"Rump Shaker" (Percapella)- 3:19

B-side
"Rump Shaker" (Radio Mix)- 3:56
"Rump Shaker" (Teddy 2)- 6:00
"Rump Shaker" (Dub)- 6:00

Charts

Weekly charts

Year-end charts

Decade-end charts

Certifications

References

External links
On the Continuing Resonance of "Rump Shaker" (Blog from "The Village Voice")

1992 singles
Songs written by Pharrell Williams
Song recordings produced by Teddy Riley
Dirty rap songs
New jack swing songs
1992 songs
MCA Records singles
Songs written by El DeBarge